Michael Palin's New Europe is a travel documentary presented by Michael Palin and first aired in the UK on the BBC on 16 September 2007 and in the US on the Travel Channel on 28 January 2008. Palin visits 20 countries in Central and Eastern Europe – the programme was filmed in the wake of the 2004 enlargement of the European Union (and shortly before the 2007 enlargement), which included many of the countries visited by Palin and significantly reshaped east–west relations on the continent. The filming was done in 2006 and early 2007 using HD (high definition) equipment. The result was made into seven one-hour programmes for BBC One and simulcast on BBC HD. A book, New Europe, was also written describing the trip, and illustrated with photographs by Basil Pao.

Episodes
The series consists of seven one-hour episodes:

References

External links

Palin's Travels –- the official website

 Michael Palin's Interview 

2007 British television series debuts
2007 British television series endings
2000s British documentary television series
BBC television documentaries
2000s British travel television series
Television shows filmed in Albania
Television shows filmed in Bosnia and Herzegovina
Television shows filmed in Bulgaria
Television shows filmed in Croatia
Television shows filmed in the Czech Republic
Television shows filmed in Estonia
Television shows filmed in Germany
Television shows filmed in Hungary
Television shows filmed in Latvia
Television shows filmed in Lithuania
Television shows filmed in North Macedonia
Television shows filmed in Moldova
Television shows filmed in Poland
Television shows filmed in Romania
Television shows filmed in Russia
Television shows filmed in Serbia
Television shows filmed in Slovakia
Television shows filmed in Slovenia
Television shows filmed in Turkey
Works by Michael Palin